Héctor Sáez Benito (born November 6, 1993 in Caudete) is a Spanish cyclist, who currently rides for UCI ProTeam . He was named in the startlist for the 2017 Vuelta a España.

Major results

2010
 1st  Road race, National Junior Road Championships
2011
 2nd Time trial, National Junior Road Championships
2014
 10th Overall Volta a Portugal do Futuro
2015
 2nd Gran Premio Macario
2019
 1st Stage 6 Volta a Portugal
 7th Overall Vuelta a Castilla y León
  Combativity award Stage 13 Vuelta a España

Grand Tour general classification results timeline

References

External links

 
 
 

1993 births
Living people
Spanish male cyclists
Sportspeople from Albacete
Cyclists from Castilla-La Mancha